Elven Webb (29 August 1910 – September 1979) was a British art director. He won an Academy Award and was nominated for another in the category Best Art Direction.

Selected filmography
Webb won an Academy Award for Best Art Direction and was nominated for another:
Won
 Cleopatra (1963)
Nominated
 The Taming of the Shrew (1967)

References

External links

1910 births
1979 deaths
British art directors
Best Art Direction Academy Award winners